Emigrant is an unincorporated community in Park County, Montana, United States. As of the 2010 census, the ZIP Code Tabulation Area (59027) for Emigrant had a population of 372.

Geography

Emigrant relies largely on tourism. Most of its facilities and services are open year round.

Emigrant sits between the Absaroka Range and the Gallatin Range in Paradise Valley. The community is located just a few miles west of Emigrant Peak, elevation . It is situated between Highway 89 and Murphy Lane, making it a crossroads to the Chico Hot Springs Resort, which is situated a few miles southeast.

Climate
This climatic region is typified by large seasonal temperature differences, with warm to hot (and often humid) summers and cold (sometimes severely cold) winters.  According to the Köppen Climate Classification system, Emigrant has a humid continental climate, abbreviated "Dfb" on climate maps.

Demographics

History

Emigrant is situated very close to the site of defunct Yellowstone City, which was established in 1863 but eventually abandoned and replaced by Chico, sometimes called "Old Chico" or "Chico City," which is situated a few miles South at the mouth of Emigrant Gulch.

The town of Emigrant as it stands today originated as a railroad stop for much of the mining and agricultural activities taking place in the area. It is a much newer community than nearby Chico but has overshadowed Chico due to strategic location. Although the railroad pulled out as transporting freight by truck became standard, Emigrant did not suffer the decline other rural towns in the region had due to its ability to tap into regional tourism. Much of the current structures in Emigrant are newer and well maintained with an "old western" architectural theme.

In August 1864, three emigrants, who came to Montana on the Bozeman Trail, arrived and found men already hard at work mining the creek. The new arrivals decided to try their luck farther up the rugged gulch, finding pay dirt high up the side of Emigrant Peak. The strike caused a stampede that drew several hundred miners and a few women to this remote area deep in Crow Indian country. The miners worked the gravel with moderate success for several weeks before cold weather drove them down to Yellowstone City, near the mouth of Emigrant Gulch.

This settlement was a collection of fifty rough log cabins with dirt roofs and elk hide floors. Supplies ran short during that winter; flour was scarce and tobacco cost $300 a pound, making it worth its weight in gold. The only thing plentiful was venison - for breakfast, lunch, and dinner during the long winter months. In the spring, the shortages ended and the men went back to work on their claims.

By 1866, Yellowstone City had been abandoned due to hostility with the local Indian population and dwindling placer gold. Nothing remains of the town today. The Emigrant Gulch strike was not a fabulous one, but snug stakes rewarded many of the pioneers for their energy and hardships.

Emigrant first had a post office in 1872, which only lasted 4 years but was reestablished in 1911.

Wildlife
Due to its location by the Yellowstone River, Emigrant is a popular area for fly fishing, and also home to many species, such as American badger, black-billed magpie, deer, elk, coyote, fox, and occasionally wolves and black bear.

From Emigrant, it is only a few miles to the Absaroka-Beartooth Wilderness, and the Gallatin National Forest. Emigrant's proximity to the national forests, wilderness area, Yellowstone National Park and the Yellowstone River make it an ideal spot for outdoorsmen to visit and live in.

Pop culture
Much of A River Runs Through It and The Horse Whisperer were filmed in Emigrant.

References

External links
US Census data for ZIP code 59027, Emigrant
Zip Code Data for Emigrant
Climbing information for Emigrant Peak

Unincorporated communities in Montana
Unincorporated communities in Park County, Montana